Duane Calvin Sutter (born March 16, 1960) is a Canadian former National Hockey League player and head coach. He was a four-time Stanley Cup winner with the New York Islanders.

He is one of the famed six Sutter brothers to play in the NHL. On May 21 2019, the Edmonton Oilers relieved Duane from his head of pro scouting duties.

Playing career
Duane was drafted by the New York Islanders in 1979 in the first round (17th overall). During the following season he made his debut for the Islanders, and as a rookie was a key contributor to the Islanders first Stanley Cup championship. Duane Sutter, who was dubbed "Dog" by his teammates because he yapped and barked before and during games, also contributed to the ensuing 1981, 1982 and 1983 Stanley Cup championships. Playing in the corners of the rink, Duane Sutter was tough but skillful. Sutter had an underrated passing ability and scoring touch.

In the 1980–81 season he was joined by his younger brother, Brent, on the team and they played together until Duane was traded to the Chicago Blackhawks in 1987. Duane and Brent won two of their Stanley Cups together in 1982 and 1983.

After the 1983 Cup win, Duane had the distinction winning four Stanley Cup championships in his first four seasons of the NHL. He and Brent led all players with 7 and 5 points during the first three games of that series.

He played for the Blackhawks for three seasons, but after the 1989–90 season he retired.

During 1996–98 and 2000–03 he was a part of the coaching staff in the Florida Panthers (1996–98 and 2002–03 he was assistant coach and during 2000–02 he was head coach)

Duane recently made a guest appearance in the Canadian television series, Road Hockey Rumble playing himself. He is confronted by the two hosts of the show hoping to win him over as a fan.

Duane's son Brody, is a former forward for the Western Hockey League's Lethbridge Hurricanes, and a former forward with the Manitoba Moose in the AHL. Currently playing in the DEL European League for the Iserlohn Roosters (2020–21).

Career statistics

Coaching record

See also
 List of NHL head coaches
 Notable families in the NHL

References

External links

1960 births
Calgary Flames executives
Canadian ice hockey right wingers
Chicago Blackhawks players
Chicago Blackhawks scouts
Edmonton Oilers executives
Edmonton Oilers scouts
Florida Panthers coaches
Lethbridge Broncos players
Living people
Medicine Hat Tigers coaches
National Hockey League first-round draft picks
New York Islanders draft picks
New York Islanders players
People from Beaver County, Alberta
Red Deer Rustlers players
Stanley Cup champions
Duane
Canadian ice hockey coaches